The 2012 Gymnastics Olympic Test Event took place between January 10 and January 18, 2012. The event featured the artistic gymnastics, rhythmic gymnastics and trampoline disciplines. It qualified the last four artistic gymnastics teams for the 2012 Olympic Games, along with 34 individual female gymnasts and 27 individual male gymnasts selected through the all-around competition. Teams that finished 17th to 24th at the 2011 World Artistic Gymnastics Championships were able to take two individuals to the test event. Teams that finished 1st to 8th were invited to send two individual gymnasts, but they were not candidates for individual spots.

The rhythmic gymnastics event, too, qualified four teams for the 2012 Olympic Games. Teams that finished 7th to 12th and the champion of the 2011 World Rhythmic Gymnastics Championships—along with the host nation of the test event, Great Britain—were invited participants, although the champion had already qualified for the Olympics. Because the world champion, Italy, decided not to attend, Azerbaijan, which placed 13th at the 2011 World Championships, was invited as a replacement. The test event also qualified five individual gymnasts for the Olympics. Twenty teams were invited to send one gymnast each according to their results at the 2011 World Championships. The host, Great Britain, could send one as well. The three medalists of the Championships were also invited despite their previous qualification to the Olympic Games. As two of the three medalists were not joining, two more teams were invited to send one gymnast apiece to the event.

In the trampolining event, seven individual competitors qualified for each of the Olympic events. These competitors were from countries that had not succeeded in qualifying an individual at the 2011 Trampoline World Championships.

The event was part of the London Prepares series of test events and took place at the 2012 Olympic venue, the O2 Arena.

Artistic Gymnastics

Men

Teams

Individuals
2 Gymnasts
: Pascal Bucher, Claudio Capelli
: Thomas Pichler, Samuel Offord
: Jeffrey Wammes, Epke Zonderland
: Manuel Almeida Campos, Gustavo Palma Simões
: Vid Hidvégi, Attila Racz
: Anton Fokin, Eduard Shaulov
: Jorge Hugo Hiraldo Lopez, Jossimar Orlando Calvo Moreno
: Stephan Gorbachev, Ildar Valeyev

1 Gymnast
: Federico Molinari
: Artur Davtyan
: Fabian Leimlener
: Shakir Shikhaliyev
: Jimmy Verbaeys
: Iordan Jovtchev
: Tomás González
: Filip Ude
: Irodotos Georgallas
: Martin Konecny
: Mohamed Sherif El Saharty
: Vlasios Maras
: Wai Hung Shek
: Kieran Behan
: Felix Aronovich
: Dmitrijs Trefilovs
: Rokas Guscinas
: Sascha Palgen
: Daniel Corral Barron
: Patrick Peng
: Roman Kulesza
: Samuel Piasecký
: Chih Yu Chen
: Adckixon Trejo
: Phạm Phước Hưng

Team Final
The Team Final happened on January 10. Four teams qualified for the Olympics. Team Great Britain won the competition (358,227), Team France was in 2nd place (350,669), Team Spain was in third place (347,292) and Team Italy qualified in 4th (346,334). Canada, Brazil, Puerto Rico and Belarus didn't qualify an entire team for 2012 Olympic Games.

Floor

Pommel horse

Rings

Vault

Parallel Bars

Horizontal Bar

Women

Teams

Individuals
2 Gymnasts
: Elsa García Rodrigues, Ana Estafania Lago
: Giulia Steingruber, Nadia Muelhauser
: Angelina Kysla, Nataliya Kononenko
: Dorina Böczögő, Laura Gombas
: Jessica López, Ivet Rojas
: Daria Elizarova, Luiza Galiulina
: Saša Golob, Adela Sajn
: Paschalina Mitrakou, Vasiliki Millousi

1 Gymnast
: Valeria Pereyra
: Barbara Gasser
: Nastassia Marachkouskaya
: Ralitsa Mileva
: Simona Castro Lazo
: Jessica Gil Ortiz
: Tina Erceg
: Kristýna Pálešová
: Yamilet Peña
: Annika Urvikko
: Rebecca Tunney
: Ana Sofía Gómez Porras
: Hyu Ying Angel Wong
: Valeriia Maksyuta
: Moldir Azimbay
: Laura Svilpaite
: Jordan Rae
: Marta Pihan-Kulesza
: Zoi Mafalda Lima
: Lorena Quinones Moreno
: Ashleigh Heldsinger
: Heem Wei Lin
: Mária Homolová
: Jonna Adlerteg
: Goksu Uctas
: Thi Ngan Thuong Do

Team Final
The team final happened on January, 11th. After solid presentations, Team Italy won the gold medal (224,624). Team Canada placed second (221,913) and team France placed third (220,744). Team Brazil placed 4th (217,985) and also qualified for 2012 Olympic Games.

Vault

Mexico's Elsa García also qualified to the vault final, but was injured during warmups and pulled out at the last moment. Because Garcia withdrew so soon before the competition, first alternate Yamilet Peña of the Dominican Republic did not have adequate time to warm up. Ergo, the vault final contained only seven gymnasts.

Uneven bars

Balance beam

Floor

Rhythmic Gymnastics
Results of Qualifying and Final Competitions.

Individual all-around

Qualification

 Q = Qualified for Event Finals
 X = Qualified for an Olympic place

Finals

Team all-around

Qualification
The top 4 teams in the qualification event qualified for the 2012 Olympics.

Final

Trampoline
Results of Qualifying and Final Competitions

Men

Qualification

 Q = Qualified for Event Finals
 X = Qualified for an Olympic place

Finals

Women

Qualification

 Q = Qualified for Event Finals
 X = Qualified for an Olympic place

Finals

See also
 2011 World Artistic Gymnastics Championships
 2011 World Rhythmic Gymnastics Championships
 2011 Trampoline World Championships

References

Olympic Test Event
London Prepares series
Gymnastics Olympic Test Event